The Sainte-Marguerite River is a river flowing in the unorganized territory of Mont-Valin, Le Fjord-du-Saguenay Regional County Municipality, in Quebec, in Canada. This river is a tributary of the Saguenay River.

Toponymy 

The name appeared on the map of the domain of the king's father Laure in 1731. It is also applied to the bay and cape located near its mouth

Geography

Courses 
This lake is recuperating water of many water bodies at West of Mont-Valin, in the zec Martin-Valin.

In final step of it course, the river turn toward South-West for a final  before flowing into the Sainte-Marguerite Bay at sea level.

The main tributaries are "la Petite rivière Sainte-Marguerite nord-est", "la rivière Valin" and "le Bras des Murailles" (including it tributary "le ruisseau Couture"). The main creeks which are tributaries of "Sainte-Marguerite River" are: Barre, Épiphanie, Épinette and "de la Cage".

The course of Sainte-Marguerite River cross many rapids, such as (from the upper part of the river):

See also 
 Zec Martin-Valin
 Zec de la Rivière-Sainte-Marguerite
 Sacré-Coeur, municipality
 Saguenay River
 Le Fjord-du-Saguenay Regional County Municipality

References 

Rivers of Côte-Nord
Geography of Saguenay, Quebec
Rivers of Saguenay–Lac-Saint-Jean